Brady Skjei (born March 26, 1994) is an American ice hockey defenseman for the Carolina Hurricanes of the National Hockey League (NHL). He was selected by the New York Rangers in the first round, 28th overall, in the 2012 NHL Entry Draft.

Prior to joining the University of Minnesota, Skjei played for the USA Hockey National Team Development Program, based out of Michigan and he represents the United States in international play.

Playing career

Amateur
Skjei played two seasons of high school hockey in Minnesota for the Lakeville North Panthers. In his first season with the team, he was named Rookie of the Year, and in his second he was named the team's Most Valuable Player. For his final two years of high school, Skjei played with the USA Hockey National Team Development Program, based out of Michigan. He spent one season with the Under-17 team, and one with the Under-18 team. After his final season with the National Team Development Program, Skjei was selected by the New York Rangers in the first round of the 2012 NHL Entry Draft. During his freshman season at the University of Minnesota, Skjei played in 36 games, recording one goal and two assists.

Professional

New York Rangers

Skjei signed a contract with the New York Rangers on April 1, 2015. He reported to the Hartford Wolf Pack of the AHL as an Amateur Tryout to finish the 2014–15 season.
Skjei scored his first professional goal (and point) in a Calder Cup playoff game against the Providence Bruins on April 26, 2015.

He was promoted to the Rangers from Hartford on December 15, 2015 after recording 2 goals and 9 assists in 27 games for the Wolf Pack to start the 2015–16 season. Injuries to various New York Rangers' defenseman increased Skjei's ice time, but he failed to score any points in the 7 regular season games he played for the team. In the playoffs, Skjei recorded two assists as the Rangers were eliminated in the first round in 5 games by the Pittsburgh Penguins. On December 11, 2016 Skjei scored his first NHL goal against the New Jersey Devils. On April 16, 2017 he scored his first career playoff goal against the Montreal Canadiens. On April 29, 2017, Skjei had his first multiple goal game, when he scored two goals against the Ottawa Senators in the 2017 Stanley Cup playoffs. On June 21, 2017, Skjei was named to the NHL's 2017 All-Rookie team.

Returning for his sophomore 2017–18 season, the Rangers struggled as a team, announcing a team rebuild in February. Skjei would see his points total dip to 25, but also a significant increase in ice time following the trade of team captain Ryan McDonagh. After his second season, Skjei signed a six-year deal with the Rangers on July 28, 2018.

Carolina Hurricanes
On February 24, 2020, Skjei was traded to the Carolina Hurricanes in exchange for a 2020 first-round pick.

International play
Skjei represents the United States in international play. His first taste of international hockey was at the 2011 World U-17 Hockey Challenge, where he recorded one goal and three assists in 6 games, while helping the USA to a second-place finish. In 2012, Skjei played in several tournaments with the American Under-18 team, including the 2012 IIHF World U18 Championships, capturing a gold medal in the first International Ice Hockey Federation sanctioned tournament he played in. He attended the American evaluation camp in preparation for the 2013 World Junior Championship, but was not selected for the final team. Skjei was selected to the American team for the 2014 World Junior Tournament.

Personal life
While attending Lakeville North High School in Minnesota, Skjei played quarterback on the varsity football team and was also a member of the golf team. His grandfather played football at the University of Minnesota. 

In early August 2021, Skjei married his longtime girlfriend, Gracia Bonesho.

In popular culture 
Skjei was portrayed by Alex Moffat in the November 18, 2017, episode of Saturday Night Live, hosted by Chance the Rapper. Skjei was reported to have enjoyed the sketch, which poked fun at the pronunciation of his surname.

Career statistics

Regular season and playoffs

International

References

External links

1994 births
Living people
American men's ice hockey defensemen
Carolina Hurricanes players
Hartford Wolf Pack players
Ice hockey players from Minnesota
Minnesota Golden Gophers men's ice hockey players
National Hockey League first-round draft picks
New York Rangers draft picks
New York Rangers players
People from Lakeville, Minnesota
USA Hockey National Team Development Program players